AMBO pipeline was a planned oil pipeline from the Bulgarian Black Sea port of Burgas via the Republic of Macedonia to the Albanian Adriatic port of Vlorë.

History
The pipeline was proposed in 1993. On 27 December 2004, prime-ministers of Albania, the Republic of Macedonia and Bulgaria signed the latest political declaration, followed by the memorandum of understanding between representatives of Albania, the Republic of Macedonia and Bulgaria and Ted Ferguson, the president and CEO of AMBO.  On 30 October 2006, Albania and the Republic of Macedonia signed a protocol to determinate the entrance points of the pipeline. The entrance point will be Stebleve village in Albania and Lakaica village in the Republic of Macedonia. A similar protocol between Bulgaria and the Republic of Macedonia was signed later in 2006.

On 31 January 2007, the Republic of Macedonia, Bulgaria and Albania signed a trilateral convention on the construction of the AMBO pipeline.  This document was ratified by the Parliaments of all three countries and governed the construction, operation, and maintenance of the pipelines.

In 2006, intervention was proposed by Russia (President Putin) with a proposal for a competing pipeline from Burgas to Alexandropoulos in Greece. The financing of this was to be by Russia and was tied to the finance of an Atomic Energy Power Plant. It took at least four years for the Russian proposal to be discarded. By which time shipping in the Bosphorus had settled into an acceptable operation and shippers/investors were reluctant to commit financing.

Description
There would be four pump stations, two in Bulgaria and one each in the Republic of Macedonia and Albania, constructed along the route. A pre-front-end engineering and design study (FEED) was to be prepared by KBR. The pipeline was expected to be operational by 2011.

Current Status - 2022
AMBO-Pipeline LTD is taking over the project and has begun the necessary work to begin the environmental study and construction afterwards. Currently, the company has received pre-approvals to privately fund the construction of the project in full; funding will be done in 2 phases. Previously, the project had received funding approval from the EXIM Bank at 25%equity/75%loan and AMBO had failed to secure the $318M USD in 2004 to begin developing the pipeline. Since then, the building costs of the project have increased from $1.3B USD to approximately $1.7B USD.

AMBO-Pipeline LTD is attempting to utilise the blockchain technology and NFT smart-contracts as kick starter to secure funds necessary for legal, due diligence and administrative costs to activate the pending loans.

Project company
The pipeline was to be built and operated by the US-registered Albanian Macedonian Bulgarian Oil Corporation (AMBO). The project was backed by the US government, who financed a feasibility study of pipeline.

Alternative projects
Other pipeline projects were the Burgas-Alexandroupoli pipeline from Burgas to the Greek Aegean port Alexandroupoli, and the Pan-European Pipeline from Constanţa in Romania to Trieste in Italy. Compared with Burgas-Alexandroupoli pipeline, the AMBO pipeline would be longer and more expensive, but Vlorë (which is a sheltered, deep-water, all-weather port) could accommodate larger tankers and is more accessible than Alexandroupoli. Also, an oil spill in the Aegean would have a negative influence on Greece's tourism industry.

See also

 Burgas-Alexandroupoli pipeline
 Pan-European Pipeline
 Baku-Tbilisi-Ceyhan pipeline
 Trans-Balkan Pipeline

References

Oil pipelines in Albania
Oil pipelines in Bulgaria
Oil pipelines in North Macedonia
Cancelled energy infrastructure
Albania–Bulgaria relations
Albania–North Macedonia relations
Bulgaria–North Macedonia relations
Black Sea energy